Race with the Devil is a 1975 American action horror film directed by Jack Starrett, written by Wes Bishop and Lee Frost, and starring Peter Fonda, Warren Oates, Loretta Swit, and Lara Parker. This was the second of three films Fonda and Oates would star in together (The Hired Hand, (1971) was their first, and 92 in the Shade (1975) was their third). Race with the Devil is a hybrid of the horror, action, and car chase genres.

Plot
Roger Marsh and Frank Stewart own a successful motorcycle dealership in San Antonio, Texas. Together with their wives Kelly and Alice, and Kelly's small dog, they leave San Antonio in a recreational vehicle (RV) for a much anticipated ski vacation in Aspen, Colorado.
Along the way, they set up camp in a desolate meadow in central Texas, where Roger and Frank race their motorcycles together. Later that night, after their wives retire to the RV, the men witness what turns out to be a Satanic ritual human sacrifice (Peggy Kokernot) a short distance from their campsite, across a river.

After being chased by the Satanists and barely escaping with their lives, they arrive in a small town and report the incident to Sheriff Taylor, who investigates but attempts to convince them that they probably only saw hippies killing an animal. Unbeknownst to the sheriff, Roger steals a sample of dirt stained with the murder victim's blood, intent on delivering it to the authorities in Amarillo, as he became suspicious of being driven to the crime scene without having had to offer any directions.

At the same time, while cleaning, the wives find a cryptic rune pinned to the broken rear window of the RV, and they steal books about occultism from the local library to further research the incident, unaware they're being watched by a man in a red truck. One of the books reveals that the ritual is what Satanists often perform to gain magical powers. As the foursome leaves town, the sheriff notices the red truck that begins to follow the RV, making it clear that he is either aware or part of the Satanic cult.

When the couples arrive at an RV park, Kelly sees she is being stared at by its residents while in a swimming pool and wants to return home. Nonetheless, she accepts a dinner invitation from another couple at the park. While at the restaurant/nightclub, Kelly again sees she is being stared at menacingly, this time by one of the musicians. When they return from dinner, the group discovers that Kelly's dog has been killed and hanged from the RV's broken open door, causing them to immediately leave the park. Shortly afterward, they find two rattlesnakes planted in the cupboards by the cultists. The frightened Kelly and Alice scream and panic, causing Frank to accidentally drive into a tree and break the RV motor's fan before the snakes are killed.

The next day, Kelly's dog is buried, after which Roger and Frank repair the motor and find their motorbikes' tires, wheels and gas tanks cut. They purchase a shotgun and head towards Amarillo while being spied on by a steadily increasing number of cultists who seem to be networked throughout numerous small Texas towns. When Roger tries to place a long-distance call to the highway patrol, he finds one dead payphone and another with a "bad connection", and is told that long-distance service is down by a "big wind from up north".

The couples leave for Amarillo and are chased by the Satanists in various trucks, which the couples escape. Later, they encounter a staged school bus "accident" that Frank sees through, since it occurs on a Sunday, and none of the children appear hurt. The couples flee the scene and have another showdown with the cult members during another high-speed chase that pits their RV against numerous trucks and cars. Roger and Frank kill or injure most of the attackers, and the couples escape.

The RV's headlights were damaged during the chase, which forces the foursome to stop in a field at nightfall. They begin to celebrate when they pick up a radio signal coming from Amarillo. In the middle of their celebration, they hear chanting outside the RV and find themselves surrounded by cult members wearing black robes with hoods, including Sheriff Taylor and the couple with whom they had dinner. The film ends as the cultists light a ring of fire around the RV, trapping the couples inside while the chanting continues.

Cast
 Peter Fonda as Roger Marsh
 Warren Oates as Frank Stewart
 Loretta Swit as Alice
 Lara Parker as Kelly
 R.G. Armstrong as Sheriff Taylor
 Clay Tanner as Delbert, "Jack" Henderson
 Carol Blodgett as Ethel Henderson
 Ricci Ware as Ricci Ware
 Paul A. Partain as Cal Mathers
 James N. Harrell as Gun Shop Owner
 Karen Miller as Kay
 Arkey Blue as Arkey Blue
 Jack Starrett as Gas Station Attendant
 Wes Bishop as Deputy Dave
 Paul Maslansky (uncredited) as Road Worker In Cowboy Hat
 Dan Hewitt Owens (uncredited) as Jay
 John Buckley (uncredited) as Satanist

Production
Race with the Devil was shot on location in Bandera, San Antonio, Castroville, Tarpley, and Leakey, Texas. Director Jack Starrett later claimed he hired actual Satanists to serve as cultist extras, although that statement was likely made for publicity purposes. Starrett directed the similar B-movie action film A Small Town in Texas the following year.

Release
20th Century Fox released the film theatrically in the United States, in June 1975. Box office receipts were more than U.S. $12M domestically, and it earned an equal amount internationally. It earned North American rentals of $5.8 million.

Critical reception
Race with the Devil received mixed reviews from critics. On Rotten Tomatoes, the film has a 64% rating based on 14 reviews, with an average rating of 5.5/10.
The film has developed a strong cult following since the advent of home media.

Home media
In October, 1985, CBS/Fox Video released it on its Key Video logo. In October 1991, then-newly established FoxVideo reissued it. In 2005, Anchor Bay Entertainment released the film on DVD.  This version is currently out of print.

On April 12, 2011, Shout! Factory released the film on DVD, packaged as a double feature with another Peter Fonda film, Dirty Mary, Crazy Larry. As of June 4, 2013, this double feature set is available on Blu-ray; and it is available online for streaming rentals and purchases through Amazon Video, the ITunes Store, and Vudu.

Remakes
A remake was planned in 2005, written by Drew McWeeny and Scott Swan, with Chris Moore (of Project Greenlight fame) to serve as director.

Kevin Smith has said Race With the Devil was a strong influence on his film Red State (2011). The film was also the basis for the Tamil language film Kazhugu (Eagle), released in 1981, and Drive Angry starring Nicolas Cage, released in 2011.

See also
 List of American films of 1975

References

External links
 
  
 

1975 films
1970s English-language films
1975 horror films
1970s action horror films
1970s supernatural horror films
American supernatural horror films
American action horror films
American chase films
Films scored by Leonard Rosenman
Films about automobiles
Films about Satanism
Films about vacationing
Films directed by Jack Starrett
Films set in Texas
Films shot in San Antonio
Films shot in Texas
20th Century Fox films
1970s road movies
1970s American films